The 2016 Minnesota House of Representatives election was held in the U.S. state of Minnesota on November 8, 2016, to elect members to the House of Representatives of the 90th Minnesota Legislature. A primary election was held in several districts on August 9, 2016. The election coincided with the election of the other house of the Legislature, the Senate.

The Republican Party of Minnesota won a majority of seats, remaining the majority party, followed by the Minnesota Democratic–Farmer–Labor Party (DFL). The new Legislature convened on January 3, 2017.

Background
The last election resulted in the Republican Party of Minnesota winning a majority of seats, after losing a majority to the Minnesota Democratic–Farmer–Labor Party (DFL) only two years earlier in the previous election. This resulted in split control of the Legislature for the first time since 2006, ending eight years of unified control by either the DFL or the Republicans as well as ending two years of all-DFL control of the Legislature and governorship.

Electoral system
The 134 members of the House of Representatives were elected from single-member districts via first-past-the-post voting for two-year terms. Contested nominations of the DFL and Republican parties for each district were determined by an open primary election. Minor party and independent candidates were nominated by petition. Write-in candidates must have filed a request with the secretary of state's office for votes for them to have been counted.

Retiring members

Republican
 Mark Anderson, 9A
 Dave Hancock, 2A
 Tim Kelly, 21A
 Tara Mack, 57A
 Denny McNamara, 54B
 Tim Sanders, 37B

DFL
 Joe Atkins, 52B
 Jason Isaacson, 42B
 Carolyn Laine, 41B
 Carly Melin, 6A
 Jerry Newton, 37A
 Kim Norton, 25B
 Dan Schoen, 54A
 Yvonne Selcer, 48A
 Erik Simonson, 7B

Competitive districts
According to MinnPost, the Star Tribune, the Pioneer Press, and MPR News, a total of 25 districts were competitive. MinnPost considered 17 districts to be competitive—12 of which were held by the Republicans and five by the DFL, the Star Tribune 22—16 of which were held by the Republicans and six by the DFL, the Pioneer Press eight—seven of which were held by the Republicans and one by the DFL, and MPR News 14—11 of which were held by the Republicans and three by the DFL.

Primary elections results

Opinion polling

Results

District results 

The following sought election but later withdrew.

Seats changing parties

See also
 Minnesota Senate election, 2016
 Minnesota elections, 2016
 Minnesota gubernatorial election, 2014

Notes

References

External links
 Elections & Voting - Minnesota Secretary of State

2016 Minnesota elections
Minnesota House of Representatives elections
Minnesota House of Representatives